RS3 or RS-3 may refer to:

Vehicles

Automobiles
 Audi RS3, a 2011–present German compact performance car
 Baojun RS-3, a 2019–present Chinese subcompact SUV

Other
 RS3 (sail), a windsurfing sail
 ALCO RS-3, diesel locomotive built by American Locomotive Company and Montreal Locomotive Works
 Aprilia RS Cube, also known as the RS3, a 2002–2004 Italian MotoGP race bike

Video games
 Racing Simulation 3, a 2002 racing video game
 Romancing SaGa 3, a 1995 role-playing video game
 RuneScape 3, a 2013 fantasy massively multiplayer online role-playing video game

Other uses
 Resistant starch RS3, a prebiotic starch formed when starch-containing foods are cooked and cooled